Fraymakers is a platform fighting game developed by McLeodGaming. It was released in early access on Linux, macOS, and Windows PC via Steam on January 18, 2023. The game is additionally planned to release on Nintendo Switch once the early access period is complete. The game's character roster is composed of crossover characters from other indie games, including Octodad (2010), Downwell (2015), Rivals of Aether (2017), Slay the Spire (2019), Slap City (2020), and the Bit.Trip series.

Gameplay 
Fraymakers is a platform fighting game. Its roster of playable characters is composed of crossover characters from other indie games, including Octodad (2010), Downwell (2015), Rivals of Aether (2017), Slay the Spire (2019), Slap City (2020), and the Bit.Trip series. Several stages appear based on the fictional universes that the playable characters belong to. 

Non-player character (NPC) "assists"—25 additional crossover characters from games such as Machinarium (2009), CrossCode (2018), and Ape Out (2019)—appear during gameplay to aid the player. An external content editor, "FrayTools", allows users to develop custom content for the game.

Development 
Fraymakers is being developed by McLeodGaming—the developers of Super Smash Flash 2—and Team Fray.

Marketing and release 
An early access version of Fraymakers was initially planned for release in 2022 and funded through a campaign on the crowdfunding platform Kickstarter in late 2020. On January 18, 2023, the early access version was released on Linux, macOS, and Windows PC via the online storefront Steam. Fraymakers is planned to remain in early access for approximately two years before its full release. The early access version features four characters, five stages, and 20 assists. Post-release, an additional character is planned for release as downloadable content (DLC).

Notes

References 

Upcoming video games scheduled for 2025
Multiplayer and single-player video games
Platform fighters
Early access video games
Windows games
MacOS games
Linux games
Indie video games
Crossover fighting games